

Result by school and by year 

259 teams have appeared in the NCAA Division I women's basketball tournament in one or more years, between 1982 (the initial year that the post-season tournament was under the auspices of the NCAA) and 2014. The results for each year are summarized in the table below.

The code in each cell represents the furthest the team made it in the respective tournament:

 - Not in tournament
 O Opening Round (only in 1983)
 1 First round
 2 Second Round
 S Sweet Sixteen
 E Elite Eight
 F Final Four
 R National Runner-up
 C National Champion

References

Appearances